Keith Moffitt is a British Liberal Democrat local government politician.  He was a Councillor for West Hampstead from 1994, and in the local elections of May 2006 became the first ever Liberal Democrat Leader of Camden London Borough Council, ending Labour's 35-year hold on the borough. He was also the first openly gay leader of the council.

In the May 2010 local elections, Moffitt was re-elected for his West Hampstead seat, but removed as Council leader as Labour re-took control of the borough.  Following the delayed Haverstock elections, which gave his party a higher number of seats than the  Conservatives, he served as Leader of the Opposition. He lost his seat in the 2014 election.

Career

Moffitt speaks fluent French, German and Portuguese.  In 2004 he ran in the European elections to represent London in the European Parliament.

Before becoming leader of the council Moffitt worked as a translator.  He previously had a 20-year career with British Coal, working in International Relations and European Community affairs, and was Chairman of the United Nations Working Party on Coal Trade from 1986 to 1992.

In 2006 Moffitt suspended his professional career in order to focus on his new role leading Camden Council. He subsequently resumed his career in languages and went on to become Chair of Council of the Chartered Institute of Linguists.
from 2012 to 2016.

Policies

Moffitt campaigned on a platform of freezing the Council Tax in his first year of office and, together with his Conservative coalition partners, honoured this pledge through the council's "Better and Cheaper" agenda.  This cost-cutting programme attracted significant criticism from the opposition Labour party.

References

External links
Personal Page at Camden Council
Leader's pages at Camden Council

Living people
Liberal Democrats (UK) councillors
Councillors in the London Borough of Camden
Year of birth missing (living people)
Place of birth missing (living people)
Leaders of local authorities of England